Dave Tiueti (born 6 June 1973) is a former Tongan rugby union player who played for Ospreys regional team as a winger. He won 21 caps for Tonga, scoring 33 points.

Tiueti made his debut for the Ospreys regional team in 2003 having previously played for Neath RFC, Tonmawr RFC, Bristol Rugby and Rugby Viadana.

References

External links 
Ospreys Player Profile

1973 births
Living people
Tongan rugby union players
Ospreys (rugby union) players
Tonga international rugby union players
Rugby Viadana players
Rugby union wings